Prijedor is a city and municipality located in the Republika Srpska entity of Bosnia and Herzegovina. As of 2013, it had a population of 89,397 inhabitants within its administrative limits. Prijedor is situated in the northwestern part of the Bosanska Krajina geographical region.

Prijedor is known for its mixed religious heritage comprising Eastern Orthodox Christianity, Roman Catholicism and Islam. Historic buildings from the Ottoman and Austrian-Hungarian periods are a feature of the urban landscape. The city underwent extensive renovation between 2006 and 2009.

Geography 
The town of Prijedor, within the municipality of Prijedor, is located in the north-western part of Bosnia and Herzegovina, on the banks of the Sana and Gomjenica rivers, and at the south-western hills of the Kozara mountain.

It is traditionally a part of the historical and cultural region of Bosanska Krajina in Bosnia and Herzegovina.

The terrain ascends to the north-east of Prijedor in waves and gradually becomes the mountain range of the Kozara mountain, which is famous from the peoples' uprisings in the previous centuries and battles against fascism during the Second World War.

The city lies on the alluvial terrain created by the Sana river and its tributaries on the south-western hillsides of the Kozara mountain.

History

Ancient period 

Prijedor's history as a fortified centre of population can be traced back to the end of the 17th century, but the history of the colonization and culture of the surrounding area is much older, predating the emergence of the town. Numerous prehistoric, ancient and mediaeval archeological sites are evidence of the presence of a variety of different cultures. There are numerous settlements from the prehistoric period, dating back to 2100 B.C., usually associated with burial sites. In the pre-Roman and Roman times the area was settled by a large Illyrian tribe Maezaei, a sub-tribe of the Pannonians, renowned for their mining skills. In Ljubija near Prijedor, many Roman age monuments have been found that provide evidence of iron production. In Zecovi there is an Illyrian necropolis from the Iron Age. A legend says that the river Sana was named by the Romans.

Ottoman and Austrian Period 

Prijedor is mentioned for the first time as a small wooden fort in the list of those places in the Ottoman Empire that were devastated by Croatian troops between 1693 and 1696.
These regions were under Ottoman dominion until 1878. About 200 years ago in this part of Bosnia a large number of fortifications were constructed in order to protect often contested borders with Austria. Later on, many fortifications were destroyed during the Austro-Ottoman War as the borders moved towards the east and south in favor of Austria. The first mention of the town, which refers to it as “Palanka Praedor” in a Latin written report of an Austrian field marshal about burnt fortified settlements, occurs between 1693 and 1696. The term “Palanka” indicates a wooden fortification built on an artificially created island on the river Sana. It is not clear how Prijedor got its name, but there are two theories. One of them refers to the term  “prodor” in the local tongue meaning penetration or penetration of the Sana river, which often flooded the entire area. The second theory concerns a race between a man and a horse (a horse is commonly known as “Doro”). As the man won, it is said that the man reached the finish line before the horse, in the local language “Prije Dore”.

At the same place in the middle of the 18th century, a new fortress appeared, this time built with stone walls, three towers and two clay causeways for the cannons. An archived information from Istanbul dated 1745 tells about two town guards crossing over to the newly built Palanka Pridorska Ada (island). It is the first mention of the fortress on the river Sana where the town developed later.

With the emergence of the fortification, the settlement outside of the walls began to develop at the same time. The settlers were probably a Christian population who lived in the vicinity and whose settlements rapidly merged with the town as it expanded to the north. Attesting to this is an account of an Austrian secret agent about the existence of the town for the purposes of the Austrian army, in which he described the town in detail and especially emphasized the suburb in its vicinity.

The town started to develop rapidly thanks to the navigability of the Sana River, the development of commerce and craft, and the later construction of the first railway through Prijedor. The first railroad in Bosnia and Herzegovina was built in 1873 next to Prijedor and went from Dobrljina to Banja Luka. The fortress existed as a military spot until 1851 when the army left and the walls were demolished by the local population who used the walls to build their own houses. A huge fire in 1882 destroyed 119 houses, 56 big commercial stores, schools, an Eastern Orthodox church, and 140 families lost roofs over their heads. The next year the Austrian authorities opened a large sawmill at the foot of the mountain Kozara, which is the first industrial object in the history of Prijedor.

The years after the fire brought on intensive development of the town, encompassing both private and state-owned structures. The wood was replaced with modern building materials, the streets were designed at right angles and the first town plan was created. New buildings were built, such as the Serbian elementary school, the Catholic Church, the Eastern Orthodox Church, and a hotel. The first cultural associations appeared in the town as well as libraries, reading rooms and a printing house. The end of the First World War created a fledgling state—the Kingdom of Serbs, Croats, and Slovenes—with Bosnia-Herzegovina as a part of it. Prijedor was an important place as the trade and craft centre of the whole region. The opening of the iron ore mine in Ljubija near Prijedor in 1916, which employed about 4,000 workers, strengthened the economy of the town. During that period, the mine was one of the biggest and most modern iron ore mines in Europe.

From 1929 to 1941, Prijedor was part of the Vrbas Banovina of the Kingdom of Yugoslavia.

World War II 
The memorial centre Mrakovica at Kozara, the work of the academic artist Dušan Džamonja, is dedicated to this region's Yugoslav partisans resistance victims during WWII.

Some villages around Prijedor and Kozara Mountain suffered the deaths of tremendous numbers of civilians, who were killed by the Ustaše and taken to different concentration camps during genocide campaign; the most notorious of these was the Jastrebarsko Concentration Camp,  where Serb children were imprisoned.

Bosnian war 

During the Bosnian war (1992–1995), the area near Prijedor housed the infamous Omarska camp, Keraterm camp, and Trnopolje camp established in 1992 for the Bosniak and Croat population.

Demographics

Population

Ethnic composition

Education 

The first forms of organized education can be tracked back in the first half of the 19th century. In 1834 Prijedor had the "Serbian elementary school" that later with so-called "Communal school" was transformed into "State school" in 1919. One of the first most important school institutions was the Prijedor Gymnasium founded in 1923.

Elementary and High schools
Nowadays, there are 11 elementary schools with circa 8,000 students and 6 high schools attended by 4,000 students. A music school and a special school for mentally dysfunctioned persons are also part of the municipal educational system.

Colleges and Universities
Over the last several years, important steps were taken, aimed at establishing colleges. As a result, Prijedor now has a University college of Economics and Informatics, a University College of Medicine, and a mining geology branch department of the University of Banja Luka.
In the northwestern part of the city in the neighborhood of Pećani a Law and Economics faculty is under construction, this are the first steps to establish an independent university centre in Prijedor.
Today Prijedor has around 1300 enrolled students.

Economy

Prijedor is a large service and industrial centre and hosts some of the largest companies in Bosnia and Herzegovina.

It has a developed financial sector; 11 international banks are represented in the city, as well as 5 microcredit organizations and a foundation for development.
The city's huge economic potential lies in its strategic geographical location, as it is close to Zagreb, Belgrade, Budapest and Vienna, giving it one of the best climates for economic expansion in Bosnia-Herzegovina.

The agricultural land around the city, raw minerals in the municipality and growth of high educated population in the city proper gives it a unique combination of both being able to produce sophisticated industrial products, food and service branches.

Economic preview
The following table gives a preview of total number of registered people employed in legal entities per their core activity (as of 2018):

Companies

The city today hosts the Bosnian headquarters of the ArcelorMittal Steel Company, which is the world's largest steel company, with over 320,000 employees in more than 60 countries. Prijedor also contains companies specialized in the chemical industry such as Ferrox A.D., producing iron oxides-pigments. BosnaMontaza A.D., one of Bosnia and Herzegovina's most specialized steel manufacturers, manufactures steel, pipelines, reservoirs, technological equipment, cranes and energy plants.

Other companies such as the Croatian food company Kraš has one of its biggest facilities in Bosnia and Herzegovina in Prijedor, producing confectionery products under the brand names MIRA and Kraš. Brand names such as "Prijedorčanka" are one of the leading producers of the alcoholic beverage Rakija in Bosnia and Herzegovina, placing its products in Bosnia and Herzegovina, Serbia and Croatia.

Celpak Prijedor used to be a big enterprise producing cellulose and paper for export, but has become defunct.

Sectors

Agricultural sector

Among fish production, Prijedor has a fruit growing industry, gardening industry, crop farming industry, mill and bakery industries, stock farming industry, processing industries, as well as a milk industry.

Lake Saničani, near Prijedor, is one of the biggest commercial fish farming lakes in the southern Europe. Prijedor municipality takes up 834.06 hectares (58.450, 00 private property and 24.956,00 state property). Plowed fields and gardens take up 34.026,00 hectares, orchards 2.386 hectares and vineyards 5 hectares. All cultivate soil takes up 40.206,00 hectares.

Services sector
The services sector in Prijedor is growing rapidly and this is reflected in the growth of hotels, stores, roads, educational facilities and shoppings centres that are being built in the city, making it a growing commercial hub in Bosnia and Herzegovina.

Transport and aviation 

Prijedor has a high standard of roads thanks to the Prijedor putevi Company and is planning a highway connection to Banja Luka in the east and Sisak to west to shorten the distance to Zagreb from the Bosanska Krajina region.
A so-called "brzi put" a semi highway is being prepared to connect Prijedor to the Zagreb-Belgrade highway via Bos./Koz. Dubica in the north.

The city is also connected to the rail system in Bosnia and located on the Zagreb-Sarajevo-Ploče line.

The city has a public transport system with 3 bus lines serving 60 stations in and around the city.

Prijedor also has an airfield in the north-eastern part of the city in the area of Urije. The airfield has a fleet of light aircraft and sailplanes. The airfield also serves as the home of the city's renovated Parachuting club.

Culture 

Prijedor has a various number of galleries, religious sights, libraries, statues, fountains, national monuments, cinemas and a city theater.

Archeological findings

Evidence that Prijedor was settled dates from 2100 B.C., the traces of life are evident in numerous settlements in the region of the present-day town, with necropolises subjacent to the settlements, as a rule.

Prijedor was settled by the Illyrian tribe Maezaei, a sub-tribe of Pannonians, with a talent for mining. In Ljubija near Prijedor, there are evidence of iron production from the Roman period. In Zecovi close to Prijedor, there is an Illyrian necropolis from the Iron Age.

Museums 
Prijedor is home of the Museum of Kozara founded in 1953, which has a regional status.

It is also home of the local national hero, Dr. Mladen Stojanovic. His house is today converted into the Stojanovic Memorial House.

At Kozara National Park in the vicinity of Prijedor, there is the Mrakovica war museum. It includes the Second World War history photographs, guns and artillery used during the Battle of Kozara.

Theatre 
Pozorište Prijedor was founded in 1953, though the tradition of theatre in Prijedor can be dated back to the 19th century. The theatre hosts different plays during the year, starring actors from within and outside of Bosnia and Herzegovina. Besides theatrical plays, the theatre hosts local city choirs that perform regularly.

Religious sites

Prijedor is known for being a multi religious society including a Catholic church, Eastern Orthodox churches and Mosques. Due to this Prijedor has a large number of mosques in the city centre, one of the oldest dating back to the 16th and 17th century.

The most known is the City mosque "Carsijska dzamija" built in 1750 located the main street. The mosque includes a library and a school.
Mostly all of Prijedor municipality's 33 mosques and the catholic cathedral that were damaged and destroyed are now rebuilt and renovated.

Other sights is the Eastern Orthodox church "Crkva Svete Trojice" built in 1891 which is surrounded with a wall including a small church park.
The catholic cathedral "Sv. Josip" built in 1898 is located in the northern part of the city centre close to the city theatre.

Prijedor used to have a small Jewish population before WWII and the Bosnian war, but today there are no traces of the former Jewish population in the city.

Culture

Festivals

The Day of Honey: Locally called "Dani meda". Trade-tourist event where local honey producers from the Prijedor area and farer away gather at the square in the main street to sell and demonstrate their products.

Prijedor summer and river Festival: "Ljeto na sani". Includes a wide music program, sport activities and other happenings along the city river beach.

Writers Gathering: Each year in September, cultural gathering "Writers gathering in Kozara", where works of literal art by local authors are being presented is taking place.

Days of the Winter: This tourist event is held at the beginning of February in the mountain Kozara. It lasts three days and its main aim is to promote tourist potentials of the Kozara mountain. Sporting and gastro competitions followed by a rich entertaining programme are an integral part of this event.

International Chorus Festival – Zlatna Vila: This cultural event is held in Prijedor People's Theatre every May and it represents a competition in choral singing. Participants to the festival are choruses from different countries both from ex-Yugoslavia and abroad.

St Peter's Day Parachuting Cup: Each year, in the month of July, a sporting event, St Peter's Day Parachuting Cup is held. Parachutists from different countries take part in this event, and competitions are organised in various categories, women, men, juniors and teams.

SHA Fest (ŠA Fest): A non profit annual festival of music and arts established to honour a multitalented late artist Dalibor Popovic Miksa. It usually takes place at the end of July. The first 2 days of free performances on 3 stages take place in the pedestrian area SHA Street (ŠA ulica). The main 2 day event on other 3 stages occupies the Old Town (Stari Grad) - Summer Garden (Ljetna Bašta) and its surroundings, including a river beach and a camp area. All profit goes to the D.P.Miksa Foundation for promotion of arts, scholarships and funding of talented artists.

Sport
The local football club, FK Rudar Prijedor, plays in the highest ranked football league of Bosnia and Hercegovina The Premier League of Bosnia and Herzegovina.

Among the oldest sporting clubs in Prijedor is the football club OFK Prijedor founded in 1919. The tennis club of Prijedor was founded by Mladen Stojanović in 1932, though tennis was first played in the town in 1914.
Every summer since 1967 the Club organizes tennis tournament in memoriam of Dr Mladen Stojanovic (previously Memorijal, now called Prijedor Open).
On Mrakovica, Kozara skiing centre is located. All ski lifts are functional and there is a ski path for children on Mrakovica as well. The skiing centre is inside the Kozara national park and there are several possibilities for mountain house rentals. A renovated hotel with various sport facilities lies close to the path.

Other popular sports in Prijedor are Basketball and Handball. The highest ranked teams are ZKK Mladost Prijedor, KK Prijedor (Basketball), and RK Prijedor (Handball).

Gallery

Notable people

Mladen Stojanović, leader of Yugoslav Partisans in western Bosnia and a People's Hero of Yugoslavia
Nermin Alukić Čerkez, musician, vocal and guitarist in the well-known Bosnian Sevdalinka band, "Mostar Sevdah Reunion"
Zlatan Arnautović, former handball player, Olympic champion
Nasko Budimlić, musician, drummer in the Bosnian hard rock band Divlje Jagode
Edis Elkasević, Croatian shot putter
Nebojša Grahovac, professional handballer
Vehid Gunić, journalist and writer
Fikret Hodžić, professional bodybuilder
Idriz Hošić, football player, European Championship silver medalist
Josip Iličić, Slovenian football player
Eldin Jakupović, Swiss football player
Milja Marin, the subject of the iconic photograph Kozarčanka
Dragomir Mrsic, Swedish actor
Nebojša Popović, handball player, Olympic champion
Živko Radišić, politician and former chairman of the Presidency of Bosnia and Herzegovina
Sreten Stojanović, sculptor
Borislav Topić, football player
Todor Švrakić, painter
Siniša Saničanin professional footballer who plays as for Partizan and the Bosnia and Herzegovina national team

International relations

Twin towns – sister cities

Prijedor is twinned with:

 Bovec, Slovenia
 Centro Storico – Piedicastello (Trento), Italy
 Demir Hisar, North Macedonia
 Kikinda, Serbia
 Irkutsk, Russia
 Manisa, Turkey
 Ningbo, China
 Øygarden, Norway
 Pančevo, Serbia
 Velenje, Slovenia

Partnerships
 Novo Mesto, Slovenia

See also
Ljubija mine

References

External links
 Official Municipality of Prijedor website

 
Populated places in Prijedor
Municipalities of Republika Srpska
Archaeology of Illyria